The Roman Catholic Diocese of Pécs (Hungarian: Pécsi Egyházmegye) is a diocese of the Latin Church of the Roman Catholic church in Hungary. The Cathedral of Pécs is dedicated to Saint Peter and Saint Paul.

Secular offices connected to the bishopric
The Bishops of Pécs were perpetual ispáns  of Baranya (Hungarian: Baranya vármegye örökös főispánja, Latin: Baraniensis perpetuus supremus comes) from the 16th century until 1777.

List of the bishops of Pécs
Bonipert (1009–1036)
St Maurus (1036–c. 1075)
Stephen I (c. 1093)
Simon (c. 1108–b. 1136)
Nana (c. 1135)
Macarius I (b. 1138–b. 1143)
John I (b. 1143–c. 1148)
Antimius (c. 1148–c. 1158)
Macarius II (b. 1162–1186)
Kalán from the kindred Bár-Kalán (1186–1218)
Bartholomew le Gros (1219–1251)
Achilles from the kindred Hont-Pázmány (1251–1252)
Job from the kindred Záh (1252–b. 1282)
Sede vacante (1282–1293)
Paul Balog (1293–1306)
Manfred (elected, but not consecrated) (1306)
Peter I (1306–1314)
Ladislaus Kórógyi (1314–1345)
Nicholas Neszmélyi (1346–1360)
William of Koppenbach (1361–1374)
Bálint Alsáni (1374–1408)
Sede vacante (1408–1410)
John Albeni (1410–1420)
 (1421–1444)
Andrew Kálnói (1445–1455)
Nicholas Barius (1455–1459)
Janus Pannonius (1459–1472)
Sigismund Ernuszt (1473–1505)
George Szatmári (1505–1522)
Szaniszló Várallyai † ( 1541 Appointed – 21 Apr 1548 Died) 
Antun Vrančić (Antal Verancsics) † ( 1554 Appointed – 1557 Appointed, Bishop of Eger) 
György Draskovics † (17 Jul 1560 Appointed – 22 Mar 1564 Confirmed, Bishop of Zagreb (Agram))
Mikuláš Telegdy † ( 1579 Appointed – 22 Apr 1586 Died) 
Nikola Stepanić Selnički (1596–1598)
Johannes Pyber de Gyerkény † (29 Jul 1613 Appointed – 7 Apr 1631 Appointed, Bishop of Eger)
Benedikt Vinković † (6 Jun 1633 Appointed – 28 Apr 1642 Confirmed, Bishop of Zagreb (Agram))
István Bosnyák † (14 Jul 1642 Confirmed – 23 Sep 1644 Died)
György Széchényi † (6 May 1647 Appointed – 9 Jun 1653 Appointed, Bishop of Veszprém)
Pál Hoffmann † (3 Aug 1655 Appointed – 24 Jun 1659 Died)
Ján Salix O. Cist. † (21 Nov 1661 Confirmed – Mar 1668 Died)
Ján Gubasóczy † ( 1668 Appointed – 1676 Appointed, Bishop of Vác) 
Pál Széchényi O.S.P.P.E. † (18 Apr 1678 Confirmed – 24 Nov 1687 Appointed, Bishop of Veszprém)
Mátyás Ignác Radanay † (7 Sep 1689 Confirmed – Apr 1703 Died)
Wilhelm Franz Johann Bertrand von Nesselrode † (21 Jul 1710 Confirmed – 29 Sep 1732 Died)
Anton von Thurn und Valsassina † (2 Mar 1733 Appointed – 25 Dec 1734 Died)
Juan Álvaro Cienfuegos Villazón, S.J. † (15 Nov 1735 Appointed – 18 Aug 1739 Died)
Zsigmond József Berényi † (30 Sep 1740 Appointed – 25 Sep 1748 Died)
György Klimó † (15 Nov 1751 Appointed – 2 May 1777 Died)
Pál László Esterházy † (2 Apr 1781 Appointed – 7 Nov 1799 Died)
József Király † (11 Jan 1808 Appointed – 17 Jul 1825 Died) 
Ignác Szepesy de Négyes † (11 Jan 1828 Appointed – 16 Jul 1838 Died)
János Scitovszky † (18 Feb 1839 Appointed – 28 Sep 1849 Appointed, Archbishop of Esztergom) 
György Girk † (10 Mar 1853 Confirmed – 24 Nov 1868 Died)
Zsigmond Kovács † (25 Jun 1869 Appointed – 25 Jun 1877 Appointed, Bishop of Veszprém) 
Nándor Dulánszky † (25 Jun 1877 Confirmed – 24 Jan 1896 Died)
Sámuel Hetyey de Eadem † (14 Dec 1897 Appointed – 1 Sep 1903 Died) 
Gyula Zichy † (11 Dec 1905 Appointed – 31 Aug 1925 Appointed, Archbishop of Kalocsa) 
Ferenc Virág † (27 Mar 1926 Appointed – 2 Mar 1958 Died) 
Ferenc Rogacs † (2 Mar 1958 Succeeded – 20 Feb 1961 Died) 
József Cserháti † (10 Jan 1969 Appointed – 3 Nov 1989 Retired) 
Mihály Mayer (3 Nov 1989 Appointed – 19 Jan 2011 Retired)
György Udvardy (9 Apr 2011 Appointed – )

Auxiliary bishops 
 József Petheö † (24 July 1797 – 3 July 1809 Died)

References

Sources 
 Korai Magyar Történeti Lexikon (9-14. század), főszerkesztő: Kristó, Gyula, szerkesztők: Engel, Pál és Makk, Ferenc (Akadémiai Kiadó, Budapest, 1994)
 Fallenbüchl, Zoltán: Magyarország főispánjai 1526-1848 (Argumentum, Budapest, 1994)
 Magyarország Történeti Kronológiája I-III. – A kezdetektől 1526-ig; 1526-1848, 1848-1944, főszerkesztő: Benda, Kálmán (Akadémiai Kiadó, Budapest, 1981, 1982, 1993)
 Magyar Történelmi Fogalomtár I-II. – A-K; L-ZS, főszerkesztő: Bán, Péter (Gondolat, Budapest, 1989)
 Fallenbüchl, Zoltán: Magyarország főméltóságai (Maecenas, 1988)

History of Christianity in Hungary
Pécs
Roman Catholic dioceses in Hungary
Baranya (region)
History of Baranya (region)
Pecs, Roman Catholic Diocese of
1009 establishments in Europe